Anouchka Delon (born  25 November 1990) is a French-Dutch actress.

Early life 
Delon is the daughter of Alain Delon and Rosalie van Breemen. She has a younger brother, Alain-Fabien Delon, and two older half-brothers, Christian Aaron "Ari" Boulogne, from her father's affair with German singer, actress and model Nico, and Anthony Delon, from his marriage to actress and model Nathalie Delon. She is the aunt of the supermodel Alyson Le Borges. She has different colored eyes, one brown and one blue.

Career
At age 12, Delon appeared alongside her father in the TV film Le Lion, an adaptation of the novel by Joseph Kessel. From 2007 to 2010, she trained at the Cours Simon in Paris. In 2011, she performed with her father on stage at the Théâtre des Bouffes-Parisiens.

In 2015, Delon was a participant in the game show Fort Boyard.

Personal life
In November 2019, it was announced Delon was expecting a child with her boyfriend Julien Dereims. Their son was born on 14 February 2020. They have been married since 2021.

Filmography

Television 
 2003 : Le Lion de José Pinheiro (TV film) : Patricia Bullitt
 2011 : Amour et sexe sous l'occupation d'Isabelle Clarke et Daniel Costelle (Documentary): Narration
 2011 : L'occupation intime d'Isabelle Clarke et Daniel Costelle (Documentary): Narration 
 2014 : Une journée ordinaire (Captation), France 2

Theater 
 2011 : Une journée ordinaire d'Éric Assous, mise en scène Jean-Luc Moreau, Théâtre des Bouffes-Parisiens
 2014-2015 : Une journée ordinaire d'Éric Assous, mise en scène Anne Bourgeois, Tournée.
 2015 : Hibernatus by Jean Bernard-Luc, directed by Steve Suissa, Théâtre de la Michodière

References

External links 
 

French film actresses
French television actresses
French people of Dutch descent
French people of Corsican descent
1990 births
People from Gien
Living people
Anouchka